{{Infobox song
| name       = If You See Him/If You See Her
| cover      = IfYouSeeHerBrooksReba.jpg
| alt        =
| type       = single
| artist     = Reba McEntire and Brooks & Dunn
| album      = If You See Him (Reba McEntire album) and If You See Her (Brooks & Dunn album)
| released   = April 27, 1998
| recorded   =
| studio     =
| venue      =
| genre      = Country
| length     = 3:59
| label      = MCA Nashville/Arista Nashville
| writer     = Tommy Lee JamesJennifer KimballTerry McBride
| producer   = Tony BrownTim DuBois
| prev_title =
| prev_year  =
| next_title =
| next_year  =
| misc       = 

}}
"If You See Him/If You See Her" is a song written by Terry McBride, Jennifer Kimball and Tommy Lee James, and recorded by American country music artist Reba McEntire, along with the duo Brooks & Dunn.  It served as the title track to each artist's respective 1998 albums (If You See Him for Reba, and If You See Her for Brooks & Dunn), both released on June 2 of that year. The song was concurrently promoted and distributed by both artists' labels: MCA Nashville and Arista Nashville, then the respective labels for McEntire and Brooks & Dunn.

Content
It is a ballad, alternating McEntire's vocals with those of Ronnie Dunn (one half of the duo), while Kix Brooks (the other half) provides harmony vocals on the verses sung by Dunn. McEntire and Brooks & Dunn debuted the song at the Academy of Country Music awards in 1998.

The song reached number one on the Billboard Hot Country Singles & Tracks (now Hot Country Songs) charts for the week of June 27, 1998, and held that position for two weeks, giving McEntire her twenty-ninth number one single, and Brooks & Dunn their twelfth.

On the Brooks & Dunn: The Last Rodeo special on (on CBS) May 23, 2010, Lady Antebellum sang this song with Reba McEntire and Brooks & Dunn coming in towards the end.

Music video
The video starts off with Reba at a bar ending a meal with ladies. Then, Kix Brooks comes to the bar. Then, Reba sings in an empty fancy theatre, along with Ronnie Dunn. A piano on the stage is seen in the background, and Kix is seen playing the piano. Before the end of the video, Kix and Ronnie are talking to each other as Kix is going to his truck. After Ronnie leaves, Kix goes into his SUV. Then, his phone rings, and talks with Reba for a little bit. After they hang up, Kix drives away.

Chart positions
"If You See Him/If You See Her" debuted at number 32 on the U.S. Billboard'' Hot Country Songs chart for the week of May 2, 1998. It peaked at number 1 and it stayed in the position for two consecutive weeks.

Year-end charts

References

1998 singles
1998 songs
Reba McEntire songs
Brooks & Dunn songs
Vocal collaborations
Songs written by Terry McBride (musician)
Songs written by Tommy Lee James
Song recordings produced by Tony Brown (record producer)
Music videos directed by Deaton-Flanigen Productions
Songs written by Jennifer Kimball
MCA Nashville Records singles
Arista Nashville singles
Lyrics